Ryūshi, Ryushi or Ryuushi (written: 龍志 or 龍子) is a masculine Japanese given name. Notable people with the name include:

, Japanese painter
, Japanese professional wrestler, mixed martial artist and kickboxer

Japanese masculine given names